Levi Smans (born 25 March 2003) is a Dutch professional footballer who plays as a midfielder for Eerste Divisie club VVV-Venlo.

Career
Smans returned to the VVV-Venlo youth academy in 2020 from amateur club SHH, after having already played for the club at under-10 and 11 levels. Ahead of the 2021–22 season, he was promoted to the first team alongside six other academy players. On 13 August 2021, he made his professional debut under head coach Jos Luhukay, replacing Joeri Schroyen in a 2–1 away loss to TOP Oss. He scored his first goal in a league game against Dordrecht on 5 September, which proved to be the winner as the match ended 1–0. On 15 September, Smans signed his first professional contract with VVV until 2025.

The award was presented to him by technical director Willem Janssen, who had himself been the first recipient of the award in 2004.

Career statistics

References

External links
 

Living people
2003 births
Dutch footballers
Eerste Divisie players
VVV-Venlo players
People from Roermond
Footballers from Limburg (Netherlands)
Association football midfielders